Nikolay Dmitriyevich Yegorov (1951–1997) was a Russian politician. He was the Governor of Krasnodar Kray in 1992-1994 and in 1996–1997, Minister for the Ethnic Affairs of the Russian Federation in 1994–1995 and the representative of the President of Russian Federation in Chechnya, the chief of the Russian presidential administration, 1995–1996.

Yegorov also played an important role in the leadership of Yeltsin's reelection campaign.

Biography 
Yegorov graduated from the Stavropol State Agrarian University, Higher Party School under the Central Committee of the CPSU. He worked as an instructor of the district party committee, secretary of the state farm party committee, chairman of the collective farm, chairman of the Labinsky District executive committee. In 1990–1993 - First Deputy Chairman of the Krasnodar Krai Agro-Industrial Union, General Director of the Department of Agriculture and Food, First Deputy Head of the Krai Administration of Krasnodar, Chairman of the Krai Government.

On December 23, 1992 was appointed governor of the Krasnodar Krai.

References

External links 
Biography 

1951 births
1997 deaths
1st class Active State Councillors of the Russian Federation
Governors of Krasnodar Krai
Kremlin Chiefs of Staff
Deputy heads of government of the Russian Federation